Conus goajira is a species of sea snail, a marine gastropod mollusk in the family Conidae, the cone snails, cone shells or cones.

These snails are predatory and venomous. They are capable of "stinging" humans.

Description
The size of the shell attains 35 mm. The shell is generally orange in colour and usually, but not always has a white stripe pattern (can be vertical or horizontal)

Distribution
This marine species occurs off Cabo la Vela, Goajira Peninsula, Colombia

References

 Petuch, E. J., 1992. Molluscan Discoveries from the Tropical Western Atlantic Region (i). La Conchiglia: International Shell Magazine, 23 (264 ): 36 -40
 Tucker J.K. & Tenorio M.J. (2013) Illustrated catalog of the living cone shells. 517 pp. Wellington, Florida: MdM Publishing.
 Puillandre N., Duda T.F., Meyer C., Olivera B.M. & Bouchet P. (2015). One, four or 100 genera? A new classification of the cone snails. Journal of Molluscan Studies. 81: 1-23

External links
 To World Register of Marine Species
  Conus Biodiversity Website : Conus goajira

goajira
Gastropods described in 1992